Ectophasia crassipennis is a species of 'parasitic flies' of the family Tachinidae, subfamily Phasiinae.

Description
Their large compound eyes are reddish. In this quite variable species the body may be blackish or orange-brownish. The broad abdomen is flattened and sternite 7 is ventrally folded. The large wings have wide brownish or greyish dots and the cell R5 is opened at the edge. It is quite difficult to distinguish this species from the similar Ectophasia oblonga.

Distribution
This fly is present in Southern Europe and warmer parts of Central Europe.

Biology
These flies can mostly be encountered from early August through late September feeding on nectar of flowers (especially of Apiaceae and Asteraceae species).

The larvae are parasitic of Hemiptera (Pentatomidae, Acanthosomatidae, Coreidae and Lygaeidae species).

References

 James E. O'Hara, Hiroshi Shima, & Chuntian Zhang - "Annotated Catalogue of the Tachinidae (Insecta: Diptera) of China" - Zootaxa 2190 (2009): 1-236

Phasiinae
Insects described in 1794
Diptera of Europe
Taxa named by Johan Christian Fabricius